Jacków may refer to the following places:
Jacków, Łęczyca County in Łódź Voivodeship (central Poland)
Jacków, Radomsko County in Łódź Voivodeship (central Poland)
Jacków, Lublin Voivodeship (east Poland)
Jacków, Silesian Voivodeship (south Poland)